The Charles M. Prather Barn, near Kingman, Kansas, was built in about 1938 by Charles M. Prather and local carpenters.  It was listed on the National Register of Historic Places in 2002.

It was built during the Depression out of materials salvaged from railroad refrigerator cars and from other railroad structures. Its interior walls and exterior siding was flooring of railroad cars. Railroad bridge timbers support the loft floor. Metal siding is from roofs of railroad cars.

It was deemed notable as "an excellent example of vernacular design, planned and built by its original owner and local workers. The barn's materials are unique in their ingenuity, salvaged from railroad yards in Wichita and assembled in the present location to create a one-of-a-kind structure that remains in near-original condition."

The barn has a prominent hay hood.

See also
Louis Werner Barn, also NRHP-listed in Kingman County

References

External links

Barns on the National Register of Historic Places in Kansas
National Register of Historic Places in Kingman County, Kansas
Buildings and structures completed in 1938
Kingman County, Kansas
Barns in Kansas
Barns with hay hoods